Walter Joseph Boasso (born May 10, 1960) is an American businessman and Democratic former state senator from Chalmette, the seat of government of St. Bernard Parish in south Louisiana. He was defeated in a bid for governor in the October 20, 2007, nonpartisan blanket primary by the Republican Bobby Jindal. Boasso won 47 percent in his own St. Bernard Parish, his sole plurality showing in any of his state's sixty-four parishes. From 2004 to 2008, Boasso represented Senate District 1, which includes parts of Orleans, Plaquemines, St. Bernard, and St. Tammany parishes, many of those areas having been devastated by Hurricane Katrina.

Biography

A lifelong resident of St. Bernard Parish, Boasso graduated from Chalmette High School in 1978. He obtained a Bachelor of Business Administration from the University of New Orleans. He launched his own company cleaning storage tanks during summer vacations. He soon established a large corporation, Boasso America. The company is still headquartered in St. Bernard Parish and employs hundreds of people in several states. He described the business as having started "with a brush and a bucket of Tide." Boasso America Corp., was sold to a Florida company, Quality Distribution, Inc. at a profit of $60 million. The company maintains its presence in South Louisiana.

Political career

Originally a Democrat, Boasso switched to the Republican Party in the mid 1990s. He was selected as the chairman of the Port of New Orleans Authority Board of Commissioners in 2001 and to the state Senate in 2003.

On February 6, 2007, Boasso announced his plans to run in the primary for the governor. He faced opposition from the Republican U.S. Representative Bobby Jindal, who then represented Louisiana's 1st congressional district in suburban New Orleans. After the decision by Louisiana Republicans to endorse Jindal, Boasso was approached about running for governor as a Democrat.

To that end, on April 26, 2007, Boasso formally switched parties again. In addition to Jindal, he was forced to contend with rival Democrat Foster Campbell, of Bossier City in Bossier Parish, a member of the Louisiana Public Service Commission. Campbell ran again for statewide office in 2016, when the lost a race for the United States Senate seat vacated by Republican David Vitter to another Republican, John Neely Kennedy, the former Louisiana state treasurer.

Hurricane Katrina

Boasso was hailed for his response to the disaster that struck his constituents on the morning of August 29, 2005. Katrina sent a tidal surge of up to 25–30 feet in height that drowned St. Bernard Parish in a matter of minutes. Boasso was in Baton Rouge at the time, and on being advised of the situation returned to the parish before the winds had completely died. He spent the following weeks bringing supplies, including fuel, food, medicines, and transportation to the parish. Many local residents said that Boasso and Democratic then U.S. Representative Charlie Melancon of Louisiana's 3rd congressional district were nearly the only source of help for his parish. Media coverage was aimed almost entirely at New Orleans alone. Boasso noted that rescuers from Canada were in the parish before any state response got there. Boasso has continued to push for assistance for St. Bernard Parish and has promised that Boasso America will continue to operate there.

Quotes during Hurricane Katrina

 "I've got 122,000 people in my district, and everybody's been affected (by Hurricane Katrina)," said Boasso.
 "I don't care about finger pointing," Boasso said. "I'm hollering and screaming and you know what? If they can't help us we're going to help ourselves."
 "Fabulous, fabulous guys," Boasso said. Referring to the Vancouver, Canada's USAR team who came to his flooded town's aid, "They started rolling with us and got in boats to save people."
 "We've got Canadian flags flying everywhere."

Legislation

Seven weeks after Hurricane Katrina, Boasso proposed SB95 that would eliminate seven local levee boards in Greater New Orleans and replace them with one board. His bill was heavily backed by local business leaders. The bill failed, but a similar version passed in a special session in early 2006. Before Katrina, the Governor selected levee board commissioners. After Boasso's bill passed, a local blue ribbon committee selects who serves.

Electoral history

In 1996, Boasso succeeded the Republican state Senator Lynn Dean of Plaquemines Parish. After Boasso's defection, the seat returned to Republican hands. In the 2007 primary, state Representative A. G. Crowe of Pearl River defeated the Democrat Kenneth L. Odinet Sr., 11,625 (52 percent) to 10,811 (48 percent). In 2008, Odinet switched to the Republican Party in an unsuccessful candidacy for the Louisiana Public Service Commission.

State Senator, 1st Senatorial District, 2003

Threshold > 50%

First Ballot, October 4, 2003

Second Ballot, November 15, 2003

Governor of Louisiana, 2007

Threshold > 50%

First Ballot, October 20, 2007

See also

 List of American politicians who switched parties in office
Louisiana gubernatorial election, 2007

References

External links
Project Vote Smart - Senator Walter J. Boasso (LA) profile
Follow the Money - Richard D. Young
2005 2003 campaign contributions

1960 births
Businesspeople from New Orleans
Living people
Louisiana Democrats
Louisiana Republicans
Louisiana state senators
People from Chalmette, Louisiana
University of New Orleans alumni
People from Arabi, Louisiana
Candidates in the 2007 United States elections